Corfu is one of the regional units of Greece. It is part of the region of Ionian Islands. The capital of the regional unit is the town of Corfu. The regional unit consists of the islands of Corfu, Paxoi, Othonoi, Ereikoussa, Mathraki and several smaller islands, all in the Ionian Sea.

Administration

Since 2019, the regional unit Corfu is subdivided into 4 municipalities:

Central Corfu and Diapontian Islands
North Corfu
Paxoi
South Corfu

Prefecture

As a part of the 2011 Kallikratis government reform, the regional unit Corfu was created out of the former prefecture Corfu. The prefecture, created in 1864, had the same territory as the present regional unit.

Provinces
The provinces were:
Corfu Province - Corfu
Paxoi Province - Gaios

Population

See also
List of settlements in the Corfu regional unit

References

External links 
 Language:Greek(el) and English (en)
 (Multi language)

 
Prefectures of Greece
1864 establishments in Greece
Regional units of the Ionian Islands (region)